George Hunter (22 July 1927 – 12 December 2004) was a professional boxer from South Africa, who competed in the Light Heavyweight division during his career as an amateur. He was born in Brakpan. His father was born in Durban and his mother was born Pretoria. All four of his grandparents were from England.

Amateur career
Hunter represented his native country at the Summer Olympics of 1948, and was awarded the Val Barker Trophy for Outstanding Boxer at the Olympic Games.

References

External links
George Hunter's profile at databaseOlympics

1927 births
2004 deaths
Light-heavyweight boxers
Olympic boxers of South Africa
Boxers at the 1948 Summer Olympics
Olympic gold medalists for South Africa
Olympic medalists in boxing
Medalists at the 1948 Summer Olympics
People from Brakpan
South African people of British descent
South African male boxers
White South African people
Sportspeople from Gauteng